Amurru may refer to:

 Amurru kingdom, roughly current day western Syria and northern Lebanon
 Amorite, ancient Syrian people
 Amurru (god), the Amorite deity